This is a list of Charlton Comics publications.

References

External links
 Charlton Comics at the Big Comic Book DataBase
 
Atomic Rabbit at Don Markstein's Toonopedia. Archived from the original on April 7, 2012.

 
Charlton